A total solar eclipse occurred on March 29, 2006. A solar eclipse occurs when the Moon passes between Earth and the Sun, thereby totally or partly obscuring the image of the Sun for a viewer on Earth. A total solar eclipse occurs when the Moon's apparent diameter is larger than the Sun's, blocking all direct sunlight, turning day into darkness. Totality occurs in a narrow path across Earth's surface, with the partial solar eclipse visible over a surrounding region thousands of kilometres wide. It was visible from a narrow corridor which traversed half the Earth. The magnitude, that is, the ratio between the apparent sizes of the Moon and that of the Sun, was 1.052, and it was part of Saros 139.

It was the second solar eclipse visible in Africa in just 6 months.

Visibility 

The path of totality of the Moon's shadow began at sunrise in Brazil and extended across the Atlantic to Africa, traveling across Ghana, the southeastern tip of Ivory Coast, Togo, Benin, Nigeria, Niger, Chad, Libya, and a small corner of northwest Egypt, from there across the Mediterranean Sea to Greece (Kastellórizo) and Turkey, then across the Black Sea via Georgia, Russia, and Kazakhstan to Western Mongolia, where it ended at sunset. A partial eclipse was seen from the much broader path of the Moon's penumbra, including the northern two-thirds of Africa, the whole of Europe, and Central Asia.

Observations
People around the world gathered in areas where the eclipse was visible to view the event. The Manchester Astronomical Society, the Malaysian Space Agency, the Astronomical Society of the Pacific, as well as dozens of tour groups met at the Apollo temple and the theater in Side, Turkey. The San Francisco Exploratorium featured a live webcast from the site, where thousands of observers were seated in the ancient, Roman-style theater.

Almost all actively visited areas in the path of totality had perfect weather. Many observers reported an unusually beautiful eclipse, with many or all effects visible, and a very nice corona, despite the proximity to the solar minimum. The partial phase of the eclipse was also visible from the International Space Station, where the astronauts on board took spectacular pictures of the moon's shadow on Earth's surface. It initially appeared as though an orbit correction set for the middle of March would bring the ISS into the path of totality, but this correction was postponed.

Gallery

Satellite failure

The satellite responsible for SKY Network Television, a New Zealand pay TV company, failed the day after this eclipse at around 1900 local time. While SKY didn't directly attribute the failure to the eclipse, they said in a media release that it took longer to resolve the issue because of it, but this claim was refuted by astronomers. The main reason for the failure was because of an aging and increasingly faulty satellite.

Related eclipses

Eclipses of 2006 
 A penumbral lunar eclipse on March 14.
 A total solar eclipse on March 29.
 A partial lunar eclipse on September 7.
 An annular solar eclipse on September 22.

This solar eclipse was preceded by the penumbral lunar eclipse on March 14, 2006.

Tzolkinex 
 Preceded: Solar eclipse of February 16, 1999

 Followed: Solar eclipse of May 10, 2013

Half-Saros 
 Preceded: Lunar eclipse of March 24, 1997

 Followed: Lunar eclipse of April 4, 2015

Tritos 
 Preceded: Solar eclipse of April 29, 1995

 Followed: Solar eclipse of February 26, 2017

Solar Saros 139 
 Preceded: Solar eclipse of March 18, 1988

 Followed: Solar eclipse of April 8, 2024

Inex 
 Preceded: Solar eclipse of April 18, 1977

 Followed: Solar eclipse of March 9, 2035

Solar eclipses 2004–2007

Saros 139

Inex series

Metonic series

Notes

References
 Fred Espenak and Jay Anderson. "Total Solar Eclipse of 2006 March 29". NASA Technical publication (NASA/TP-2004-212762), November 2004.
 NASA – Total Solar Eclipse of 2006 March 29

 solar-eclipse-2006.info Information about the March 29th Solar Eclipse.
 Interactive 2006 March 29 Total Solar Eclipse map with local circumstances
 Eclipse.za.net, Umbral Paths of March 29 Eclipse in Africa

Photos:
 Prof. Druckmüller's eclipse photography site. Turkey, Cappadocia
 Prof. Druckmüller's eclipse photography site. Egypt
 Prof. Druckmüller's eclipse photography site. Libya
 Total eclipse photographs from Turkey
 Another set of total eclipse photographs from Turkey
 Photo gallery from Turkey
 Phases of solar eclipse view from Antalya
 NASA videos and photos from Libya and Turkey
 Pictures taken from Smolyan, Bulgaria
 NASA video of eclipse 
 Solar eclipse images and videos from Libya by traveling NASA employees and scientists
 Images by Crayford Manor House Astronomical Society from Libya and Turkey
 Spaceweather.com Eclipse gallery
 Antwrp.gsfc.nasa.gov APOD, March 30, 2006, When Diamonds Aren't Forever, totality from Greek island of Kastelorizo in the eastern Aegean
 Antwrp.gsfc.nasa.gov APOD, April 4, 2006, A Total Solar Eclipse over Turkey, totality from Adrasan, Kumluca, Antalya Province, Turkey
 Antwrp.gsfc.nasa.gov APOD, April 7, 2006, totality from Side, Turkey, a larger version of the same picture chosen as APOD again on July 26, 2009, The Big Corona, Koenvangorp.be
 Antwrp.gsfc.nasa.gov APOD, April 8, 2006, Vanishing Umbra, from Mount Hasan southeast of İncesu, Aksaray, Turkey
 The 2006 Eclipse in Turkey
 Russian scientist observed eclipse
 University of Athens – Solar Eclipse 29/3/2006, Solar Party
 Solar Total Eclipse of 2006 March 29
 Tubitak.gov.tr, 29 March 2006 Total Solar Eclipse, Scientific and Technological Research Council of Turkey (TÜBİTAK)
 Solar Eclipse over Kemer, Turkey 060329

External links

2006 03 29
2006 in science
2006 03 29
March 2006 events
2006 in Ghana
2006 in Togo
2006 in Benin
2006 in Nigeria
2006 in Niger
2006 in Chad
2006 in Libya
2006 in Egypt
2006 in Turkey
2006 in Georgia (country)
2006 in Russia
2006 in Kazakhstan